My Daughter's Tutor is a 1929 German silent comedy film directed by Géza von Bolváry and starring Harry Liedtke, Dolly Davis, and Charles Puffy. The plot closely mirrored that of Ernst Lubitsch's The Oyster Princess. It was shot at the Tempelhof Studios in Berlin. The film's art director was Robert Neppach.

Cast

References

Bibliography

External links

1929 films
1929 comedy films
Films of the Weimar Republic
German silent feature films
German comedy films
Films directed by Géza von Bolváry
Films with screenplays by Franz Schulz
German black-and-white films
Films shot at Tempelhof Studios
Silent comedy films
1930s German films
1920s German films